The Jolly Roger is a symbol that has been used by submarines, primarily those of the Royal Navy Submarine Service and its predecessors. The practice came about during World War I: remembering comments by First Sea Lord Admiral Sir Arthur Wilson, who complained that submarines were "underhanded, unfair, and damned un-English" and that personnel should be hanged as pirates, Lieutenant Commander Max Horton began flying the flag after returning from successful patrols. Initially, Horton's submarine  flew an additional flag after each successful patrol, but when there was no room for more, the practice was changed to a single large flag, onto which symbols indicating the submarine's achievements were sewn.

The practice of flying the Jolly Roger was adopted by some other submarines during World War I, but became more widespread in World War II. Flotilla commanders began to issue flags to submarines, and procedures were drafted for usage. Although some sources report the use of the flag being a universal practice among British submariners, some submarine captains did not take it up as they felt the practice was boastful and the achievements could not always be confirmed. Usage of the Jolly Roger was copied by some Allied submarines during World War II, and the flag has also been used by submarines from other Commonwealth nations.

The symbols on a Jolly Roger are used to indicate the achievements of the submarine. Bars represented ships torpedoed, although post-war flags have sometimes used the silhouette of the target ship instead. Mines indicated minelaying operations, while torches or lighthouses meant the boat had been used as a navigation marker for an operation. More unusual symbols have also been used, with comic character Eugene the Jeep marking the recovery of a Chariot manned torpedo, and a dog used for submarines involved in Operation Husky. Some icons are unique to a submarine:  bears a scarlet pimpernel flower, marking the time a French spy forgot the recognition password and instead quoted from the play The Scarlet Pimpernel to prove herself, while a stork and baby was added to the Jolly Roger of  when news of the birth of the captain's first child arrived while on patrol.

History
Following the introduction of submarines in several navies, Admiral Sir Arthur Wilson, the First Sea Lord of the Royal Navy, stated in 1901 that submarines were "underhanded, unfair, and damned un-English", and that he would convince the Admiralty to have the crews of enemy submarines captured during wartime be hanged as pirates.

In September 1914, the British submarine  successfully torpedoed the German cruiser SMS Hela. Remembering Wilson's statement, commanding officer Lieutenant Commander Max Horton instructed his signaller to manufacture a Jolly Roger, which was flown from the submarine as she entered port. Each successful patrol saw Horton's submarine fly an additional Jolly Roger until there was no more room for flags, at which point Horton had a large Jolly Roger manufactured, onto which bars indicating the ships E9s sunk were sewn. A small number of other submarines adopted the practice:  flew a red flag with the skull and crossbones on return from a foray into the Dardanelles in June 1915, and the first known photograph of the practice was taken in July 1916 aboard . The Admiralty disapproved of the practice, but was unable to stop it.

The practice restarted during World War II. The flotilla leader wanted to recognise the boat's achievement, which had involved penetrating deep into the heavily guarded Adriatic, so had a Jolly Roger made and delivered to Osiris. After this, the commanders of submarine flotillas began to issue the flags to submarines following the boat's first successful patrol. Once handed over, it became the responsibility of the boat's personnel to maintain the flag and update it with new symbols indicating the submarine's achievements. A submarine was entitled to fly the flag when returning from a successful patrol: it would be hoisted as the submarine passed the boom net, lowered at sunset, and could not be flown again until another successful patrol had occurred. The Jolly Roger could also be flown on the day a submarine returned to the UK from a successful overseas deployment. Although some sources claim that all British submarines used the flag, the practice was not taken up by those submarine commanders who saw it as boastful and potentially inaccurate, as sinkings could not always be confirmed.

Flying the Jolly Roger continued in the late 20th century and on into the 21st.  raised the flag to recognise her successful attack on the Argentine cruiser ARA General Belgrano during the Falklands War. 's Jolly Roger, now in the Royal Navy Submarine Museum, featured an atom for being the only nuclear submarine with a kill, crossed torpedoes for the type of weapon used, a dagger indicating a cloak-and-dagger operation, and the outline of a cruiser for what kind of ship was sunk.

Several submarines returning from missions where Tomahawk cruise missiles were fired fly Jolly Rogers with tomahawk axes depicted, with crossed tomahawks indicating an unspecified number of firings, or individual axes for each successful launch. The Jolly Roger has been adopted as the logo of the Royal Navy Submarine Service.

Use by other navies
The practice, while commonly associated with British submarines, is not restricted to them. During World War II, Allied submariners working with Royal Navy fleets adopted the process from their British counterparts. While operating in the Mediterranean, the Polish submarines ORP Sokół and ORP Dzik were presented with Jolly Rogers by General Władysław Sikorski, and continued to update them during the war.

At least one British surface ship recorded their U-boat kills through silhouettes on a Jolly Roger.
The Royal Australian Navy has also flown the Jolly Roger from submarines on occasion. Following the first Australian live firing of a Mark 48 torpedo in 1987,  used the flag to indicate the successful sinking of the target ship .  flew the Jolly Roger in 1980, following her successful participation in the Kangaroo 3 wargame as an opposing submarine: the flag bore the silhouettes of the seven surface ships involved, as during the exercise, Onslow had successfully 'sunk' all seven.

The reason for flying the flag has not been made public.

Symbols and meanings

See also
Clean sweep (naval), another naval tradition indicating a successful patrol, where a broom is prominently fixed to the submarine
Use of the skull and crossbones by military units

Footnotes

Citations

References

Books

Journal and news articles

Websites

Maritime flags
Maritime culture
Military traditions
Royal Navy Submarine Service
Submarines